Cecilia Angela Noble (born 11 June 1966) is an English actress who has appeared in various television series, films and on stage with a career spanning over thirty years. Some of her notable television roles include Beverley Jackson in The Bill (2004), Pauline in The Teacher (2022) and Barbara in Killing Eve (2022). Her notable theatre roles include Ruta Skadi in the play His Dark Materials (2003–2004) and Aunt Maggie in Nine Night (2018).

Life and career 
Noble was born on 11 June 1966 in Hackney, London and trained at the Royal Central School of Speech and Drama. She began her acting career in 1992, with her first credited role being Grace Kelley in the crime drama Resnick. In 1995, she played Captain Tara Weldon in two episodes of Space Precinct.

In 1997, she appeared in the third series of Thief Takers as Marilyn Parker on a recurring basis. In 2004, Noble portrayed Beverley Jackson in seven episodes of the police drama The Bill. In 2015, she played Myrtle in the drama film Danny and the Human Zoo. In 2018, she appeared in an episode of Death in Paradise. In 2022, Noble appeared in the Channel 5 miniseries The Teacher. She played Pauline, a friend and colleague of co-star Sheridan Smith's character. She also appeared in the final series of Killing Eve as Barbara.

Noble has also appeared extensively in theatre and has received several nominations for her work. In 2014, she was nominated for the Laurence Olivier Award for Best Actress in a Supporting Role for her performance in The Amen Corner at the National Theatre, and in 2019, she was shortlisted for the Evening Standard Theatre Award for Best Actress for her performances in Faith Hope and Charity and Downstate. Her other theatre credits include Nine Night, His Dark Materials, Henry V, The Recruiting Officer and Is God Is.

Filmography

Awards and nominations

References

External links
 

1966 births
21st-century British actresses
Alumni of the Royal Central School of Speech and Drama
Black British actresses
British film actresses
British soap opera actresses
British stage actresses
British television actresses
Living people
People from Hackney, London
Actors from London